This is a list of colleges and universities in Brahmanbaria, Bangladesh.

History

Brahmanbaria has about 40 colleges and universities. New colleges are opening to meet student demand.

Colleges
 Akhaura Shaheed Smriti College
Brahmanbaria Government College
 Chargach Bhuyan Degree College
 Patalpar Degree College
 Dr. Rowshan Alam College
 Alhaz Shah Alam College
 Shohagpur Model College
 Bancharampur College

University colleges 
 Tajul Islam Adarsha Degree College
 Saleemganj College
 Alhaz Abdur Razzak College
 Firoz Mia College
 Mia Abdullah Women's Degree College
 Abdus Sattar Degree College
 Nasirnagar Degree College
 Aleem Uddin Jobeda College
 Sarail Govt. College
 Sujan Dulo College
 Brahmanbaria Govt College of Women
 Brahmanbaria Pouro College
 Bangabandhu Sheikh Mujib College
 A Monem College
 Suhilpur Harun Al Rashid College
 Alhaz Begum Nurun Nahar College
 Brahmanbaria City College
 Lion Ferozur Rahman Residential School & College
 Bangladesh Gas Field School and College
 Ideal Residence School and College
 Tinni Anuwara College of Women
 Kasba College for Women
 Purbachal College
 Sayedabad Adarshya Mahabidyalay College
 Champaknagar Model School and College
 Kasba T Ali College
 Champaknagar College
Shalgaon Kalishima School & College (EIIN 103208)
Brahmanbaria United College

Engineering colleges

Medical colleges

Universities

See also
Economy of Brahmanbaria
List of people from Brahmanbaria
Tourism in Brahmanbaria

External links
 College information

 
Brahmanbaria